Rocky Star is an Indian fashion designer.

Career
Rocky Star draws inspiration from the Baroque and Gothic time periods, with influences and traces seen across all his collections. He has also designed for Beyoncé Knowles, Paris Hilton and Pussycat Dolls.

His design sensibility blends India heritage crafts and textures with opulent embroideries, focusing on occasion wear along with bridal, pret and accessories for women and men.

Rocky showcased his Autumn Winter collection, Nomadic Love at London Fashion Week in 2016.  Ever since Rocky has showcased 6 seasons at London Fashion Week with the latest showcase being in February 2019.

Movies
Rocky landed his first styling project with Akshay Kumar in 1992. Ever since, he has designed for over 350 films including Kaho Naa... Pyaar Hai (2000) and Kabhi Khushi Kabhie Gham... (2001) and Goal! (2005).
Rocky Star has also designed costumes for a Bollywood Film called Robot 2. He has designed costumes for several films in the past including Gaddar for actress Amisha Patel and Krrish for actor Hrithik Roshan.

Awards

Other 
Rocky has now opened flagship store in Khar West, ROCKY STAR STORE  in September, 2022.

Rocky also owns a restaurant in Mumbai, named Rocky Star Cocktail Bar. He has a furniture brand called Rocky Star Home by Bent Chair and a high street wear brand called RS by Rocky Star in partnership with Shoppers Stop.

References

External links 
 In Conversation with Rocky Star

Indian male fashion designers
Indian costume designers
Fashion industry
Living people
Year of birth missing (living people)
Artists from Mumbai